Aradophagus is a genus of wasps belonging to the family Platygastridae.

The genus has almost cosmopolitan distribution.

Species:

Aradophagus brunneus 
Aradophagus diazi 
Aradophagus fasciatus 
Aradophagus microps 
Aradophagus nicolai 
Aradophagus pulchricornis 
Aradophagus pulchricorpus 
Aradophagus pulchripennis 
Aradophagus sarotes 
Aradophagus squamosus 
Aradophagus trjapitzini

References

Platygastridae
Hymenoptera genera